Gani Erdi Gülaslan (born 3 March 1994) is a Turkish professional basketball player who plays as a small forward for Manisa BB of the Turkish Basketbol Süper Ligi (BSL).

Professional career
On 11 July 2015 he signed with Trabzonspor of the Turkish Basketbol Süper Ligi (BSL).

On 30 July 2016 he signed with Pınar Karşıyaka of the BSL.

On 6 July 2020 he signed with Türk Telekom of the BSL.

On 26 August 2022 he signed with Manisa BB of the Turkish Basketbol Süper Ligi.

References

External links
Yiğitcan Saybir Euroleaguebasketball.net Profile
Erdi Gülaslan TBLStat.net Profile
Erdi Gülaslan Eurobasket Profile
Erdi Gülaslan TBL Profile

Living people
1994 births
21st-century Turkish people
Afyonkarahisar Belediyespor players
Aliağa Petkim basketball players
Bornova Belediye players
Karşıyaka basketball players
Trabzonspor B.K. players
Türk Telekom B.K. players
Small forwards
Sportspeople from İzmit
Turkish men's basketball players